Sidewinder III is a streamliner dragster.

Built by Kent Fuller in 1969, it used a transversly-mounted supercharged 350 Chevy (hence "sidewinder") in a magnesium-tube chassis with a  wheelbase.  It was run by the team of Hopkins, Thornhill, and Finicle in BB/GD (B supercharged gas dragster).

Notes

Sources
 Taylor, Thom. "Beauty Beyond the Twilight Zone" in Hot Rod, April 2017, pp. 30–43.

1960s cars
Drag racing cars
Rear-wheel-drive vehicles